"Nighttime Lover" is an R&B song by American duo The System, from the 1987 album Don't Disturb This Groove. The song was written by the group's members, David Frank and Mic Murphy.

In 1987, the smooth, urban-infused tune reached number seven on the Billboard R&B Singles chart.

Track listing

1987 release
12" vinyl
 US: Atlantic / DMD-1067

Personnel
Mic Murphy: Lead and Background vocals
David Frank: Keyboards
Paul Pesco: Guitar
Jimmy Maelen: Percussion
Andy Snitzer: Sax solo
B.J. Nelson, Audrey Wheeler, Dolette McDonald: Backing vocals
New West Horns: Horns

Chart performance

References

1987 singles
The System (band) songs
Songs written by David Frank (musician)
Songs written by Mic Murphy
1987 songs
Atlantic Records singles